Qulin Tuqu Aymara quli tousled, tuqu goitre -n a suffix, also spelled Culin Thojo) is a  mountain in the Cordillera Real in the Andes of Bolivia. It is located in the La Paz Department, Los Andes Province, in the northeastern part of the Batallas Municipality. It is situated southeast of Wila Lluxita and Mullu Apachita.

References 

Mountains of La Paz Department (Bolivia)